Rubab Sayda (born 15 June 1950) is an Indian politician from Bahraich in Uttar Pradesh. Sayda is retired as Principal of Tara Girls Inter College. She is mother of Yasar Shah former Transport Minister (independent Charge) of Uttar Pradesh.

Positions held
 1995 President, Zila Panchyat Bahraich district
 2004 Elected to 14th Lok Sabha and member of Committee on Industry
 5 Aug. 2007 Member of Committee on Information Technology

See also

 Lok Sabha
Waqar Ahmad Shah
Akhilesh Yadav
Yasar Shah
Samajwadi Party

External links
Official biographical sketch in Parliament of India website

1950 births
Living people
21st-century Indian Muslims
Politicians from Meerut
People from Bahraich district
India MPs 2004–2009
Lok Sabha members from Uttar Pradesh
Women in Uttar Pradesh politics
21st-century Indian women politicians
21st-century Indian politicians
Samajwadi Party politicians
Samajwadi Party politicians from Uttar Pradesh